Denmark was represented by rapper Kølig Kaj, with the song "Stemmen i mit liv", at the 1997 Eurovision Song Contest, which took place on 3 May in Dublin. "Stemmen i mit liv" was chosen as the Danish entry at the Dansk Melodi Grand Prix on 1 March.

Before Eurovision

Dansk Melodi Grand Prix 1997 
The final was held at the DR TV studios in Copenhagen on 1 March 1997 and hosted by Hans Otto Bisgård. Ten songs competed in the contest and the winner was selected solely by a public televote, which led to the victory of "Stemmen i mit liv" performed by Kølig Kaj. The song won by a relatively narrow margin over "Utopia" performed Jette Torp, and was regarded as something of a risky choice as rap had only been tried once before at Eurovision (by the United Kingdom's Love City Groove in 1995), without a great deal of success. The show was watched by 1.1 million viewers in Denmark, making it the most popular show of the evening and third most popular show of the week.

At Eurovision 
Heading into the final of the contest, RTÉ reported that bookmakers ranked the entry 19th out of the 25 entries. On the night of the final Kølig Kaj performed 21st in the running order, following Russia and preceding France. At the close of voting "Stemmen i mit liv" had received 25 points, placing Denmark 16th of the 25 entries. The Danish jury awarded its 12 points to contest winners the United Kingdom. The contest was watched by a total of 1 million viewers in Denmark.

Voting

References 

1997
Countries in the Eurovision Song Contest 1997
Eurovision